The Combat Identification Panel (CIP), also known as a Coalition Identification Panel, is an Identification friend or foe device mounted on military ground vehicles used by United States Armed Forces' United States Army with United States Marine Corps and its allies to distinguish them from the enemy during battle.

History
Combat Identification Panels were developed after the Persian Gulf War to reduce friendly fire incidents among allied ground forces. These panels are designed to produce a distinct and easily identifiable infrared signature when seen through thermal imaging systems. Originally created as a hasty expediency, the use of low-thermal-emissivity tape and physical separation from the body of the vehicle meant that the panel would appear as a contrasting dark (i.e. cooler) area through thermal viewers.

CIPs first saw widespread use in the Iraq War where nearly all coalition vehicles were equipped with these devices, usually mounted on the sides and rear of the body and/or turret. Some were even mounted on the driver and front passenger doors of Humvees with a special cutout so the door handle could still be accessed through the panel, as well as on the hood between the windshield and the top grille.

See also

 Clapboard, the "overlapping" architectural element which it resembles
 Invasion stripes
Tactical recognition flash

References
 globalsecurity.org : Combat Identification Panels
 peoiews.monmouth.army.mil : Joint Combat Identification Marking System (JCIMS)
 fas.org : 2005 U.S. Army Weapons System Handbook : JCIMS
Opticorp, Inc. 
Military equipment of the United States